CBCT-FM is a Canadian radio station. It is the CBC Radio One affiliate for all of Prince Edward Island, with studios in Charlottetown, broadcasting at 96.1 MHz.

History
CBCT-FM was launched in 1977 on 96.9 MHz. Prior to its launch, CBC Radio programming aired on private affiliate CFCY, as well as a repeater of CBA in Moncton. In 1985, CBCT-FM's frequency was changed to 96.1. The signal is broadcast from a CBC-owned transmitting tower on Strathgartney Hill in Churchill, 15 km west of Charlottetown.

Programming
Local programs Island Morning with Mitch Cormier (6:00-8:30 a.m.) and Mainstreet with Matt Rainnie (4-6 p.m.) are produced from the station on weekdays.

Transmitters

References

External links
CBC Prince Edward Island
 

Bct
Bct
Radio stations established in 1977
1977 establishments in Prince Edward Island